Mateo Gamarra (born 20 October 2000) is a Paraguayan professional footballer who plays for Club Olimpia and the Paraguay national team.

Career
From Concepción, he joined Independiente F.B.C. at the age of 15. Playing as a central defender Gamarra had a breakthrough in 2022 featuring for Club Olimpia regularly in the league, Copa Libertadores and Copa Sudamericana. He won his first silverware with Olimpia when the club clinched the 2022 Clausura tournament.

International career
On 1 September, 2022 Gamarra made his debut for the Paraguay against Mexico.

Personal life 
One of 13 children born to Vidalia González, his father died when Gamarra was a teenager. Gamarra worked as a painter during the COVID-19 pandemic and football was suspended, in order to provide extra income for his family. Gamarra has organised friendly football matches in his hometown to raise money for local charity causes.

References

2000 births
Living people
Paraguayan footballers
Association football defenders